Zimbabwe Red Cross Society (ZRCS) was founded in 1981 by an act of the Zimbabwe Parliament. It has its headquarters in Harare.

External links
Official website
International Red Cross/Red Crescent Site

Red Cross and Red Crescent national societies
Organizations established in 1981
Medical and health organisations based in Zimbabwe
1981 establishments in Zimbabwe